In biochemistry, a synthase is an enzyme that catalyses a synthesis process.

Note that, originally, biochemical nomenclature distinguished synthetases and synthases.  Under the original definition, synthases do not use energy from nucleoside triphosphates (such as ATP, GTP, CTP, TTP, and UTP), whereas synthetases do use nucleoside triphosphates. However, the Joint Commission on Biochemical Nomenclature (JCBN) dictates that 'synthase' can be used with any enzyme that catalyzes synthesis (whether or not it uses nucleoside triphosphates), whereas 'synthetase' is to be used synonymously with 'ligase'.

Examples 
 ATP synthase
 Citrate synthase
 Tryptophan synthase
 Pseudouridine synthase
 Fatty acid synthase
 Cellulose synthase (UDP-forming)
 Cellulose synthase (GDP-forming)

References 

Lyases